A megacity is a very large city metropolitan area, typically with a population of more than 10 million people.

Megacity or Mega City may also refer to:

 Megacity (video game), a 2011 mobile video game
 Mega City (car), by French automobile manufacturer Aixam-Mega
 Mega City Vehicle, a former name of the BMW i3
 Mega City (shopping mall), a shopping mall in New Taipei, Taiwan
 Toronto, known as "Megacity" after the 1998 amalgamation of Toronto

See also
 Megalopolis, a group of two or more roughly adjacent metropolitan areas
 Mega-City One and Mega-City Two, fictional locations in the Judge Dredd series
 Mega City Four, an English indie rock band
 BMW Mega City Vehicle, now BMW i3
 MegaCity Chorus, a Canadian men's music group